The 1978 Marshall Thundering Herd football team was an American football team that represented Marshall University in the Southern Conference (SoCon) during the 1978 NCAA Division I-A football season. In its fourth season under head coach Frank Ellwood, the team compiled a 1–10 record (0–5 against conference opponents) and was outscored by a total of 292 to 113. The team played its home games at Fairfield Stadium in Huntington, West Virginia.

Schedule

References

Marshall
Marshall Thundering Herd football seasons
Marshall Thundering Herd football